Treadwell's Bookshop is a shop in Store Street, London, in the Bloomsbury area, which sells esoteric books as well as occult supplies. It originally opened in Covent Garden in 2003 and is one of the small number of esoteric bookshops in London along with Atlantis Books and Watkins Books. Treadwell's audience includes the trending number of younger urban women interested in witchcraft.

The shop has been described as a "specialist bookshop for the practicing occultist and wizard", and an "esoteric community hub" in London.

References

External links 
 
 The Guardian. (15th March 2011). `The magic of Treadwell's bookshop'  by Adam Boult

Bookshops in London